Acipenser oxyrinchus is a species of sturgeon.

Information
Acipenser oxyrinchus is a species with two subspecies:
 Atlantic sturgeon, Acipenser oxyrinchus oxyrinchus Mitchill 1815.
 Gulf sturgeon, Acipenser oxyrinchus desotoi Vladykov 1955.
Their main diet includes crustaceans, worms, and mollusks. This species is also known to migrate up the river when it is spawning. This species is recorded to be near threatened and at risk of becoming an endangered species due to dam construction, dredging, dredge spoil disposal, groundwater extraction, irrigation, flow alterations, and other surface water withdrawals. Acipenser oxyrinchus is mostly native to the countries of Canada and the United States, with a smaller population in northern Europe (essentially the Baltic region). They can be found in temperate and subtropical climates and in marine or freshwater environments.

Characteristics
The lifespan of this species can be around 60 years. The color of Acipenser oxyrinchus is bluish-black or olive brown with lighter sides and a white belly.

Behavior

Sturgeon are an anadromous species that live solitarily or in small groups. They migrate upriver in the spring to spawn. Adults are migratory while at sea and will make long migrations to coastal areas, while juveniles will stay in fresh or brackish water until they are between two and five years of age. However, many larvae and juveniles do start to migrate and disperse small distances from their spawning sites.

Migration

Sturgeons will migrate upriver to spawn. Sturgeons from the Gulf of Mexico will naturally exhibit spawning migration in the spring. Peak numbers have been observed in March and April, which is when the fish will migrate into the Suwannee River in Florida.  Sturgeon will migrate downstream for twelve days, peaking within the first six days. Atlantic sturgeons only need to move a short distance to reach rearing areas. Early sturgeon migrants tend to be nocturnal while later migrants are diurnal. During summer months, sturgeon will remain in localized bottom areas of the rivers. In the late fall, the sturgeon migrate out of spawning rivers and into the Gulf of Mexico.

For all populations and subspecies of sturgeon, there are spawning migrations into freshwater in early spring and movement into salt water in the fall. Timing and the unusual migratory behavior of sturgeon is a result of temporal water temperature changes. Studies have also shown that amongst sturgeon in Gulf of Mexico and Suwannee River in Florida, fish gained 20% of their body weight while in Gulf of Mexico and lost 12% of their body weight during their time in the river.

Spawning

In order for spawning to occur, water temperature should be above . Spawning normally lasts between nine and twenty-three days, but can continue past this as long as the water temperature remains below .

Free sturgeon embryos (the first interval of sturgeon after hatching) hide under rocks and do not migrate. They are found in the freshwater spawning areas. Larvae and some juveniles start to migrate slowly for about five months downstream. This leads to a wide dispersal of the fish.  Typically, the entire freshwater reach of the river downstream from the actual spawning site is so filled with larva-juvenile individuals that it is considered to be a nursery habitat.

Sturgeon populations will use the same spawning reefs from year to year. Habitat factors that can help determine spawning sites include the presence of gravel substrate, presence of eddy fields, slightly basic pH, and a range in calcium ion content. Eggs are usually deposited in a small area and scatter very little. It is not until larvae and juveniles start to migrate that the fish disperse widely.

Body color
Some evidence has shown that developmental body color is related to migration style. Free embryos are light and are non-migratory, while migratory larvae and adults are dark. This is found to be consistent among many Acipenser species. The reason for this is unclear, but it may be adaptive to migration behavior and camouflage.

Diet

The primary foods of sturgeon while in freshwater areas include soft-bodied annelids, arthropods, aquatic insects, and globular mollusks. Adults that have emigrated from estuaries and into the sea will usually feed on epibenthic and hyperbenthic amphipods, grass shrimp, isopods, and worms. Most adult sturgeon will also feed on detritus and biofilm. Sturgeons are most generally known for feeding on crustaceans, worms, and molluscs. 
 
Larvae-juvenile feeding was at the bottom, benthic foraging. However, food in the benthic zone is scarce, so many adapt drift feeding, in which they have holding positions in the water column and wait for food. Sturgeons may have dominance hierarchies with large fish being dominant when competing for limited foraging space.

Habitat

Sturgeons are widely distributed along the Atlantic coast of the United States. Their wide distribution and tendency to disperse has led to numerous subpopulations of sturgeon.

In general, sturgeons usually inhabit primarily the temperate waters of the northern hemisphere. Gulf of Mexico sturgeons are probably adapted to warmer water temperatures. Due to sturgeons' predilection for cooler waters, when water temperatures rise too high, sturgeon will try to find cool spring waters which serve as thermal refuges until temperatures drop again.

Susceptibility to anthropogenic disturbances

There are many wide-ranging subspecies along the Atlantic Coast of North America. Identification of distinct population segments (DPS) is problematic because of sturgeons' ability to disperse so widely. However, it is possible to do some characterization of genetic differentiation and estimate gene flow. This method has been used to determine possibility for listing under the U.S. Endangered Species Act.

The sturgeon's characteristics and life history make it susceptible to anthropogenic disturbances and make population restoration particularly difficult. They have late sexual maturity, only moderate fecundity, and spawn at low frequencies. Females spawn once every three to five years, and males every one to five years. This is due to their ability to live for an extremely long time (various sub-species can have a lifespan ranging from ten years to sixty years).

The population of Atlantic sturgeons has decreased dramatically due to overharvesting. The late 19th century saw a surge in demand for caviar, which led to overfishing of the Atlantic sturgeon. Today, only 22 out of its 38 original spawning rivers still have viable populations of the species. They are particularly susceptible to  bycatch mortality due to the many fisheries that exist within their natal estuaries. Their habitat range, which usually includes coastal spawning sites and coastal migrations, makes sturgeon well within contact of coastal fisheries.

Effects of hypoxia

Hypoxia combined with high water temperatures in the summer has been shown to be consistent with decreased survival rates of young of the year sturgeon in Chesapeake Bay.

Hypoxia is defined as low ambient oxygen levels, which may be very harmful to organisms living in the hypoxic body of water. Often, lower regions of the water column will be more hypoxic than upper levels, closer to the surface. When surface access is denied, the situation is lethal to sturgeon. Increased incidences of summertime hypoxia have led, in part, to degradation of many sturgeon nursery habitats in the United States.

Conservation 
Populations have declined dramatically over the last centuries, and even became extinct in Baltic range states in the later 20th century. Channelisation and barriers were part of the causes for declines affecting migration, along with pollution. Since 1996 Baltic sturgeon recovery has been attempted, with American donor populations used due to genetic similarities. Re-introduction with focus on returning these sturgeon to their native spawning grounds. NatureServe considers the species Vulnerable.

In 2012, the Atlantic sturgeon received protection under the Endangered Species Act.

In 2022, the International Union for the Conservation of Nature noted that sturgeon was “the animal group most at risk of extinction in the world.”

References

External links
 
 

Acipenser
Taxa named by Samuel L. Mitchill
Fish described in 1815